The Topp Baronetcy, of Tormarton in the County of Gloucester, was a title in the Baronetage of England. It was created on 25 July 1668 for Francis Topp. The title became extinct on the death of the third Baronet in 1733.

Topp baronets, of Tormarton (1668)
Sir Francis Topp, 1st Baronet (died )
Sir John Topp, 2nd Baronet (c. 1663–c. 1720)
Sir Jeremy Topp, 3rd Baronet (died 1733)

Baronetcies

Topp
1668 establishments in England
People from Tormarton